Kallakurichi Lok Sabha constituency is one of the 39 Lok Sabha constituencies in Tamil Nadu state in southern India. Its Tamil Nadu Parliamentary Constituency number is 14. This constituency came into existence following the implementation of delimitation of parliamentary constituencies in 2008.

Assembly segments
Kallakurichi Lok Sabha constituency comprises the following six Legislative Assembly segments:

Members of the Parliament

Election Results

General Election 2019

General Election 2014

General Election 2009

General Election 1971

General Election 1967

See also
 Viluppuram District
 Salem District
 List of Constituencies of the Lok Sabha
 Rasipuram (Lok Sabha constituency)

Notes

External links
Kallakurichi lok sabha  constituency election 2019 date and schedule

Lok Sabha constituencies in Tamil Nadu
Viluppuram district